Down til Dawn is the debut studio album by Polytechnic, released on April 30, 2007 in the UK. A US release date has not been announced. Much of the songs are re-recorded from previously released EPs and singles, including "Won't You Come Around?," "Pep," "Man Overboard," "Cold Hearted Business" and "Running Out Of Ideas."

Track listing
 "Bible Stories" - 4:01
 "Won't You Come Around?" - 3:21
 "Man Overboard" - 4:17
 "Rain Check" - 4:23
 "Cold Hearted Business" - 3:56
 "Still Spinning" - 5:12
 "Pep" - 2:46
 "Quay Street" - 4:08
 "Hoof" - 4:42
 "Polling Card" - 3:23
 "Running Out Of Ideas" - 6:43

References 

2007 albums